A Night in Montmartre (sometimes written as Night in Montmartre) is a 1931 British mystery film directed by Leslie S. Hiscott and starring Horace Hodges, Franklin Dyall, Hugh Williams, Reginald Purdell and Austin Trevor. It was based on a play by Miles Malleson. It was shot at Twickenham Studios in London. The film's sets were designed by the art director James Carter.

Synopsis
When the owner of a large cafe in Montmartre and a notorious blackmailer is murdered, suspicion points at young artist Lucien Borell who owed him money. Things look worse for Lucien when his father arrives and, fancying himself a criminologist, uncovers evidence that accidentally makes his son look even more guilty. On his second attempt, however, he is able to unmask the real culprits.

Cast
 Horace Hodges as Lucien Borell 
 Franklin Dyall as Max Levine 
 Hugh Williams as Philip Borell 
 Heather Angel as Annette Lefevre 
 Austin Trevor as Paul deLisle 
 Kay Hammond as Margot 
 Edmund Willard as Alexandre 
 Arthur Hambling as Inspector Brichot 
 Reginald Purdell as Tino 
 Binnie Barnes as Therese

References

Bibliography
 Cook, Pam. Gainsborough Pictures. Cassell, 1997.
 Low, Rachael. Filmmaking in 1930s Britain. George Allen & Unwin, 1985.
 Wood, Linda. British Films, 1927-1939. British Film Institute, 1986.

External links

1931 films
British mystery films
1930s English-language films
Films directed by Leslie S. Hiscott
Gainsborough Pictures films
Films set in Paris
British black-and-white films
1931 mystery films
Films shot at Twickenham Film Studios
1930s British films